The 1979 Southwest Conference men's basketball tournament was held March 1–3, 1979 at The Summit in Houston, Texas. The first round took place February 24 at the higher seeded campus sites.

Number 1 seed Arkansas defeated 2 seed Texas 39–38 to win their 2nd championship and receive the conference's automatic bid to the 1979 NCAA tournament.

Format and seeding 
The tournament consisted of 9 teams in a single-elimination tournament. The 3 seed received a bye to the Quarterfinals and the 1 and 2 seed received a bye to the Semifinals.

Tournament

References 

1978–79 Southwest Conference men's basketball season
Basketball in Houston
Southwest Conference men's basketball tournament